Patsy Hazlewood (born November 19, 1949) is an American politician and a Republican member of the Tennessee House of Representatives, representing District 27 since January 8, 2014.

Background 
Hazlewood had an extensive background in business prior to politics, retiring from AT&T, the Tennessee Department of Economic and Community Development, and as Director of CapitalMark Bank & Trust.

Education 
Hazlewood received a Bachelor of Science degree in 1973 from Middle Tennessee State University in Physics and Secondary Education.

2018 Election 
The following are the results for the 2018 District 27 Election:

|-
! colspan="2" style="text-align:left;" | Candidates
! Votes
! %
|-
| style="background-color:#ff0000;" |
| style="text-align:left;" | Patsy Hazelwood (R)
| 18,360
| 65
|-
| style="background-color:#0000ff;" |
| style="text-align:left;" | Brent Morris (D)
| 9,887
| 35
|- style="font-weight:bold; background:#f0f0f0"
| colspan="2" style="text-align:left;" | Total
| 28,247
| 100
|-

Current Legislative Committees 
Hazlewood currently serves as the Chair of the Financial Ways and Means Committee and is a member of the Banking and Investments Subcommittee, the Commerce committee and the Joint Committee on Pensions and Insurance.

Current Caucus/Non-Legislative Committees 
Hazlewood is a current member of the Tennessee State House of Representatives Business and Utilities Subcommittee, House Ethics Committee and House Finance Committee.

Civic Memberships 
Hazlewood has participated in the following civic memberships:

Honors and awards 
Hazlewood has received the TN Woman of Distinction Award for 2012, the Chattanooga Area Manager of the Year for 1999, the Chattanooga Philanthropist of the Year and the Junior League Community Service Award.

Religion 
Hazlewood is a Presbyterian and has served as an elder and trustee of Signal Mountain Presbyterian Church.

References 

Living people
1949 births
Middle Tennessee State University alumni
Republican Party members of the Tennessee House of Representatives
Women state legislators in Tennessee
21st-century American politicians
21st-century American women politicians